The 2019–20 Miami RedHawks men's basketball team represent Miami University in the 2019–20 NCAA Division I men's basketball season. The RedHawks, led by 3rd-year head coach Jack Owens, play their home games at Millett Hall in Oxford, Ohio as members of the East Division of the Mid-American Conference.

Previous season
The RedHawks finished the 2018–19 season 15–17 overall, 7–11 in MAC play to finish in fifth place in the East Division. As the No. 9 seed in the MAC tournament, they were defeated in the first round by Akron.

Roster

Schedule and results

|-
!colspan=12 style=| Exhibition

|-
!colspan=12 style=| Non-conference regular season

|-
!colspan=12 style=| MAC regular season

|-
!colspan=12 style=| MAC tournament
|-

|-

Source

References

Miami RedHawks men's basketball seasons
Miami RedHawks
Miami RedHawks men's basketball
Miami RedHawks men's basketball